Kang Hee-Chan (Hangul: 강희찬, Hanja: 姜煕燦, born 10 May 1970) is a former table tennis player from South Korea. At the 1992 Summer Olympics in Barcelona he won the bronze medal in the men's doubles this time together with Lee Chul-Seung.

References

External links
profile

1970 births
Living people
South Korean male table tennis players
Table tennis players at the 1992 Summer Olympics
Table tennis players at the 1996 Summer Olympics
Olympic table tennis players of South Korea
Olympic bronze medalists for South Korea
Olympic medalists in table tennis
Asian Games medalists in table tennis
Table tennis players at the 1990 Asian Games
Asian Games bronze medalists for South Korea
Medalists at the 1990 Asian Games
Medalists at the 1992 Summer Olympics
20th-century South Korean people